Georgeana may refer to:

 Original name for York, Maine, a town
 Georgeana (beetle), a species of beetle